Christina Chemtai Hicks is a British Kenyan environmental social scientist who is a Professor in the Political Ecology group at Lancaster University. She is interested in the relationships between individuals, societies and nature. She was awarded the 2019 Philip Leverhulme Prize for Geography.

Early life and education 
Hicks earned her undergraduate degree at Newcastle University, where she majored in tropical coast management. She completed her doctoral research at the James Cook University Australian Research Council Centre of Excellence for Coral Reef Studies. After earning her doctorate, Hicks moved to Stanford University, where she joined the Center for Ocean Solutions.

Research and career 
Hicks studied the health of global coral reefs. She showed that the coral reefs that have healthy ecosystems were in remote areas with low fishing pressure and locations where there were high levels of local engagement with local marine management. On the other hand, places with poor fisheries governance, intensive capture and a recent history of environmental disaster have worse performing coral reefs.

As global diets move to become more healthy and sustainable, "blue foods" such as fish can have low environmental impacts and are rich in micronutrients. Hicks was interested in the injustices in the production, distribution and consumption of so-called "blue foods". In 2019, Hicks was awarded an ERC Starting Grant to investigate micronutrient variability amongst fish in tropical Africa. She is interested in the impact of fishing pressure, food insecurity and the climate on these nutrient concentrations, as well as how nutrient concentrations impact social processes. She demonstrated that the nutrients in local fish were more than enough to treat people with malnutrition, but that the catch was often not accessible to people most in need. She has argued that instead of increasing revenue from fish exports, policy is required to ensure that local communities. Hicks believes that to effectively combat ecological destructions, efforts must be made to promote a healthy planet and a just society.

Hicks appeared in the Netflix documentary Seaspiracy, but criticised the film for being misleading.

Selected publications

References 

Living people
Year of birth missing (living people)
Academics of Lancaster University
Alumni of Newcastle University
James Cook University alumni
Political ecologists
Women social scientists